Falcatifolium sleumeri is a species of conifer in the family Podocarpaceae. It is found only in a small area in the far west of Western New Guinea (Papua).

References

Podocarpaceae
Endemic flora of Western New Guinea
Near threatened plants
Taxonomy articles created by Polbot
Taxa named by David John de Laubenfels